Mark Hobson (born 5 July 1976) is a British former professional boxer who competed from 1997 to 2007. He challenged once for the WBO cruiserweight title in 2006. At regional level, he held the Commonwealth cruiserweight title from 2003 to 2006 and the British cruiserweight title twice between 2003 and 2007.

Early professional career
Hobson had his first professional contest on 9 June 1997, scoring a points win over Michael Pinnock in Bradford. For the first three and a half years of his career Hobson built up a respectable record of 14–1–1 with the only loss coming against Mark Levy in 1999. On 24 April 2001 Hobson challenged South African fighter Sebastiaan Rothmann at the Olympia in Liverpool for the WBU Cruiserweight title. The fight ended in a first stoppage defeat for Hobson after the fight was ended in the 9th round.

British and Commonwealth champion
Following the Rothmann defeat, Hobson took on Germany's future WBA world champion Firat Arslan at the Barnsley Metrodome Arena and was again stopped, this time on cuts in the seventh round. Four wins, including one over Lee Swaby, followed however as Hobson positioned himself for a shot at the vacant Commonwealth cruiserweight belt on 25 January 2003 pitching himself against Ugandan Abdul Kadou and winning the contest with a fourth round stoppage. One further win followed before Hobson made the first defence of his title against Robert Norton in a fight which also had the vacant British belt on the line. The fight which took place at the Ponds Forge Arena in Sheffield on 5 September 2003 saw Hobson become a double champion with a 12-round points win.

Further defences of both titles followed with wins over Tony Moran on 13 March 2004, Lee Swaby on 27 May 2004 and former champion and world title challenger Bruce Scott on 17 December 2004. Hobson took a break from the ring in 2005 but went on to make one further defence of both his belts on 1 June 2006 against John Keeton back at the Metrodome in Barnsley.

Further title wins and challenges
Following the win over Scott and his subsequent break from the ring, Hobson returned to action on 4 March 2006 to challenge Enzo Maccarinelli for the WBU cruiserweight title in a fight that was the chief support to Joe Calzaghe's destruction of Jeff Lacy at the MEN Arena in Manchester. The fight ended in a 12-round defeat for Hobson in what proved to be a tough defence for Maccarinelli. The Keeton defence followed before, on 8 September 2006, Hobson challenged for the WBU title at the third time of asking, defeating Pavol Polakovic at the Grosvenor House Hotel in Mayfair, London.

On 14 October 2006 Hobson returned to the MEN Arena in Manchester to once again take on Enzo Maccarinelli, this time for the WBO title in what was Maccarinelli's first defence of newly won world title. The fight ended in disappointment as Hobson was unable to match the performance of his first fight with the Welshman and suffered a first round stoppage.

Hobson's final fight before retiring from the ring was to challenge former victim John Keeton for the British title that Hobson himself had vacated. The fight on 29 September 2007 at the Hallam FM Arena in Sheffield ended in victory for Hobson once more, allowing him to retire from the sport as a British champion.

Professional boxing record

References

1976 births
Living people
Cruiserweight boxers
Sportspeople from Huddersfield
English male boxers